The 30th TVyNovelas Awards, is an Academy of special awards to the best of soap operas and TV shows. The awards ceremony took place on February 24, 2012 in the Forum Mundo Imperial, Acapulco, Guerrero. The ceremony was televised in the Mexico by Canal de las estrellas.
 
Jacqueline Bracamontes, Alan Tacher and Ximena Navarrete hosted the show. La fuerza del destino won 5 awards including Best Telenovela of the Year, the most for the evening. Other winners Una familia con suerte won 4 awards, Triunfo del amor won 3 awards, La que no podía amar won 2 awards and Esperanza del corazón and Ni contigo ni sin ti won one each.

Summary of awards and nominations

Winners and nominees

Novelas

Others

Special Awards
Life in Television: Xavier López "Chabelo"
Launching TVyNovelas: Fernanda Vizzuet
50 years in Television: Don Francisco
Life in Telenovela: Silvia Pinal
Most Popular Artist of Social Networks: Maite Perroni
Most View Telenovela: Triunfo del amor

Performers

Missing
People who did not attend ceremony wing and were nominated in the shortlist in each category:
 Alejandra Guzmán (receives Juan Osorio in his absence)
 Anahí
 Carlos Ponce
 Daniela Romo
 Mark Tacher

References 

TVyNovelas Awards
TVyNovelas Awards
TVyNovelas Awards
TVyNovelas Awards ceremonies